You Are Here is the fourth album by English band South, released on 28 April 2008.

Track listing
 "Wasted"
 "Opened Up"
 "Better Things"
 "The Pain"
 "Tell Me"
 "She's Half Crazy"
 "There Goes Your Life"
 "The Creeping"
 "Lonely Highs"
 "Soul Receivers"
 "Every Light Has Blown"
 "Balloons"
 "Zither Song"
 "Final Interlude"

References

2008 albums
South (band) albums